The Blue Ribbon Award for Best Foreign Film is a prize recognizing excellence in Foreign film. It is awarded annually by the Association of Tokyo Film Journalists as one of the Blue Ribbon Awards.

List of winners

References

External links
Blue Ribbon Awards on IMDb

Awards established in 1951
Foreign Film
1951 establishments in Japan
Film awards for Best Foreign Language Film